Nicole Andrea Moreno (born 22 August 1987), also known as Luli and Luli Love, is a Chilean model, dancer, and panelist.

The winner of several beauty pageants in Chile, she was Queen of the Viña del Mar Festival in 2016, a title given by the entertainment press to the most outstanding woman of the Viñamarino festival.

Childhood and adolescence
The daughter of María Angélica and Julio Moreno, Nicole Moreno is the oldest of three siblings. She spent her childhood in the commune of San Bernardo y la Cisterna, Santiago. From a very young age, the world of modeling and dancing caught her attention. According to Moreno, her greatest aspiration when she was a child was to be a catwalk model. Moreno started working at the age of 14, but soon discovered her early pregnancy with her son Francisco Javier. In her conservative home, she says, it was difficult to assimilate, but her family managed to accept it once the baby was born. According to her, she had to postpone her adolescence to raise her son. In an interview on 4 January 2013 she also spoke about suffering from bulimia.

Discovery and "Luli"
Moreno debuted on the Chilean juvenile court television program , broadcast by the channel Mega, in 2006. Her jump to fame came in 2007 when she was invited by Chilevisión to appear on the series , where she showed her dances in Viña del Mar.

In 2010 she worked with the comedian  in the magazine Sensualísima.

She was the creator of the personality Luli Love, characterized by her particular way of speaking, by wearing a lot of pink, and by making mistakes with names. She formed a duo with the Chilean humorist . Nicole Moreno has been on different programs for more than a decade on Chilean television.

In 2011, she was crowned Queen of the Pampilla Festival in Coquimbo.

Moreno is also a businesswoman: in 2013 she opened a clothing store that bears her name. That same year she participated in the Government of Chile's campaign against discrimination.

Queen of the Viña del Mar Festival
In February 2016, Moreno was elected Queen of the Viña del Mar Festival, a title delivered by members of the press assigned to the Viña del Mar International Song Festival, via a secret ballot.

The day after the election, the prize of a sash, a ring, and the crown was delivered by mayor Virginia Reginato. The coronation ceremony took place in front of the cameras of the accredited press. The queen threw herself into the pool at the Hotel O'Higgins in Viña del Mar. The following year she handed over her title to Chilean model Francisca "Kika" Silva.

In April 2016 Moreno was featured on the cover of the Chilean magazine , where she presented a new change of style.

In December 2016 she was invited by the Chilevisión program El Cubo to tell details about her panic attack and how she became Queen of the Viña del Mar Festival.

In February 2017 she was on the cover of the magazine Caras, and later she was invited by Mega to the morning program Mucho gusto, where she served as a panelist.

Television

Awards
 2009, Queen of the 
 2011, Queen of the Pampilla Festival
 2016, Queen of the Viña del Mar Festival

References

External links
 
 

1987 births
Chilean beauty pageant winners
Chilean female dancers
Chilean female models
Chilean television presenters
Living people
Reality television participants
Chilean women television presenters
Chilean_television_personalities